The Solemn Act of Northern America's Declaration of Independence is the first Mexican legal historical document which established the separation of Mexico from Spanish rule.  It was signed on November 6, 1813, by the deputies of the Congress of Anáhuac, organized by General José María Morelos in the city of Oaxaca in June of that same year, and later installed in the city of Chilpancingo on September 13.

The document gathers some of the main political uprisings contained in "Feelings of the Nation" (Sentimientos de la Nación), a document of the speech Morelos gave to the representatives of the free provinces of southern New Spain  on September 14.

This document indicated that given the circumstances in Europe – the occupation of Spain by the Napoleonic army –  Spanish America had recovered its sovereignty from the Crown of Castile in 1808, when Ferdinand had been deposed, and therefore, any union between the overseas colonies and the Peninsula had been dissolved. This was a legal concept that was also invoked by the other declarations of independence in Spanish America, such as Venezuela (1811) and Argentina (1816), which were responding to the same events.

The resulting state would be a successor to the Viceroyalty of New Spain and it would preserve all of its territory in North America (América Septentrional). The Solemn Act defined penalties for those people who contravene the insurgent war or for those who refused to give their financial support. The Act also recognized the Roman Catholic religion as the sole, official religion of the nation.

It was signed by:
Andrés Quintana Roo
Ignacio López Rayón
Carlos María Bustamante
José Manuel de Herrera
José Sixto Verduzco
José María Liceaga
Cornelio Ortiz de Zárate

See also
Congress of Chilpancingo
Sentimientos de la Nación
Constitution of Apatzingán
Declaration of Independence of the Mexican Empire
History of democracy in Mexico

References
 Mexican Congress: Sala El surgimiento de una nación (es)
 Redescolar Ilce: Promulgación del Acta de Independencia Nacional (es)
 Chasteen, John Charles (2008). Americanos: Latin America's Struggle for Independence. Oxford: Oxford University Press.

External links
 Works related to Solemn Act of the Declaration of Independence of Northern America at Wikisource.org
Acta Solemne de la Declaración de Independencia de la América Septentrional
Sentimientos de la Nación

Mexican War of Independence
1813 in New Spain
Political history of Mexico
Colonial Mexico
Declarations of independence
November 1813 events
1813 documents